Wingfield may refer to:

People
 Anthony Wingfield (disambiguation), multiple people
 Brenda Wingfield, South African geneticist
 Lady Bridget Wingfield (died 1534), neighbour, close friend and lady-in-waiting to Anne Boleyn, second wife of Henry VIII of England
 Cecil Wingfield (1893–1955), Australian politician
 Cecil Wingfield-Stratford (1853–1939), British Army officer, and footballer
 Sir Charles John Wingfield (1820–1892), British civil servant in Bengal, later an MP
 Sir Charles Wingfield (1877–1960), British diplomat
 Charlotte Wingfield (born 1994), Maltese Olympic sprinter
 Dick Wingfield-Digby (Richard Shuttleworth Wingfield-Digby; 1911–2007), Dean of Peterborough (1966–1980)
 Dontonio Wingfield (born 1974), former American professional basketball player
 Edward Wingfield (disambiguation), multiple people
 Eileen Wani Wingfield, Aboriginal elder from Australia
 Esmé Cecil Wingfield-Stratford (1882–1971), British historian
 Folliott Wingfield, 1st Viscount Powerscourt (1642–1717), Member of Parliament for Wicklow County
 Francis Wingfield or Wingfeild (1628–unknown), English lawyer and Member of Parliament
 George Wingfield (1876–1959), Nevada banker and miner
 Gus Wingfield (born 1926), American former banker and politician
 Harry Wingfield (John Henry Wingfield; 1910–2002), English illustrator
 Humphrey Wingfield (died 1545), English lawyer, Speaker of the House of Commons
 Ian Wingfield, Solicitor General of Hong Kong (2007–2010)
 Jacques Wingfield (1519-1587), English soldier who settled in Ireland
 James Digman Wingfield (1800–1872), English painter
 Jenny Wingfield, American screenwriter and author
 John Wingfield (disambiguation), multiple people
 Lewis Strange Wingfield (1842–1891), Irish traveller, actor, writer, and painter
 Margaret Wingfield (1912–2002), British political activist
 Mark Wingfield, guitarist and composer based in the UK
 Mervyn Wingfield (1911–2005), Royal Navy officer
 Martin Wingfield (born 1951), British politician
 Mervyn Wingfield, 7th Viscount Powerscourt (1836–1904), Irish peer
 Mervyn Wingfield, 8th Viscount Powerscourt (1880–1947), Irish peer
 Mervyn Patrick Wingfield, 9th Viscount Powerscourt (1905–1973), Irish peer
 Pete Wingfield (William Peter Wingfield; born 1948), British record producer, musician and music journalist
 Peter Wingfield (born 1962), Welsh-born television actor
 R. D. Wingfield (1928–2007), English author and radio dramatist
 Richard Wingfield (disambiguation), multiple people
 Robert Wingfield (disambiguation), multiple people
 Rupert Wingfield-Hayes (born 1967),  British journalist
 Sheila Wingfield (1906–1992), Anglo-Irish poet
 Ted Wingfield (1899–1975), American baseball pitcher
 Thomas Wingfield (disambiguation), multiple people
 Wade Wingfield (born 1977), South African former cricketer
 Walter Clopton Wingfield (1833–1912), British army officer who was one of the pioneers of lawn tennis
 William Wingfield (disambiguation), multiple people
Wingfield baronets, an extinct title in the Baronetage of England

Places

Australia
Wingfield, South Australia

England
Wingfield, Bedfordshire
Wingfield, Rotherham, South Yorkshire
Wingfield Academy
Wingfield, Suffolk
Wingfield Castle
Wingfield, Wiltshire
North Wingfield, Derbyshire
South Wingfield, Derbyshire
Wingfield Manor
Wingfield railway station, a former station

South Africa
SAS Wingfield, a South African Navy base
Wingfield Aerodrome, Cape Town, South Africa

United States
 Wingfield High School, Jackson, Mississippi
Wingfield Township, Geary County, Kansas

Other uses
Wingfield Sculls, a sculling race for the Championship of the Thames
Wingfield Series, plays by Dan Needles
The Wingfield family, protagonists of Tennessee Williams' The Glass Menagerie